Jerzy Zieliński may refer to:
 Jerzy Zieliński (cinematographer) (born 1950), Polish cinematographer
 Jerzy Zieliński (painter) (1943–1980), Polish painter
 , Polish botanist

See also